Dante Boninfante (born 7 March 1977) is an Italian retired volleyball player and current coach, former member of Italy men's national volleyball team, a bronze medalist of the Olympic Games London 2012, silver medalist of the European Championship 2011 and a double Italian Champion.

Career

Clubs
In 2013 signed a contract with Marmi Lanza Verona.

Sporting achievements

Clubs

CEV Cup
  2010/2011 - with Sisley Treviso

National championships
 1999/2000  Italian Cup, with Sisley Treviso
 1999/2000  Italian SuperCup, with Sisley Treviso
 2000/2001  Italian Championship, with Sisley Treviso
 2008/2009  Italian SuperCup, with Copra Elior Piacenza
 2008/2009  Italian Championship, with Copra Elior Piacenza

National team

Olympic Games
  2012 London

References

External links

 PlusLiga player profile
 
 
 
 

1977 births
Living people
People from Battipaglia
Italian men's volleyball players
Volleyball players at the 2012 Summer Olympics
Olympic volleyball players of Italy
Olympic medalists in volleyball
Olympic bronze medalists for Italy
Medalists at the 2012 Summer Olympics
Italian expatriates in Poland
Expatriate volleyball players in Poland
Italian Champions of men's volleyball
Skra Bełchatów players
Sportspeople from the Province of Salerno